Degrande is a surname. Notable people with the surname include:

Ida Degrande (1910–?), Belgian middle-distance runner
Marigje Degrande (born 1992), Belgian chess player